Peniel Heugh (237 m) is a hill near Ancrum and Nisbet in the Scottish Borders area of Scotland. On it stands the Waterloo Monument.

Geology 
The heugh is composed of olivine micrograbbro, and is a volcanic plug.

Geography 
Places nearby include Bonjedward, Crailing, Jedburgh, Monteviot House, Roxburgh.

The Roman Heritage Way and St. Cuthbert's Way pass by the heugh and the monument.

See also
List of places in the Scottish Borders

References

External links
CANMORE/RCAHMS record of Peniel Heugh
RCAHMS record of Peniel Heugh
Scottish Borders Council: Jedburgh Local Cycling Trails
Geograph image: Iron Age Fort on Peniel Heugh
Geograph image: The Waterloo Monument on Peniel Heugh

Sources
Parkhouse, G (2006), 'Peniel heugh, Scottish Borders (Crailing parish), fieldwalking', Dorchester

Extinct volcanoes
Hill forts in Scotland
Mountains and hills of the Scottish Borders
Scheduled monuments in Scotland
Volcanic plugs of Scotland